Slugs: The Movie (known under the Spanish title, Slugs, Muerte Viscosa) is a 1988 American/Spanish horror film based upon the novel Slugs (1982) by Shaun Hutson.

Plot 
When a rural town becomes prey to a strain of black slugs spawned from the disposal of toxic waste, it is up to the local health inspector to stop them. People die mysteriously and gruesomely, and only health worker Mike Brady has a possible solution, but his theory of killer slugs is ridiculed by the authorities. Only when the body count begins to rise and a slug expert begins investigating the town does it begin to appear as though Brady's theory may be right.

Cast 
 Michael Garfield - Mike Brady 
 Kim Terry - Kim Brady  
 Philip MacHale - Don Palmer 
 Alicia Moro - Maureen Watson 
 Santiago Álvarez - Foley 
 Concha Cuetos - Maria
 Frank Braña - Frank Phillips
 Patty Shepard - Sue Channing
 Kari Rose - Donna Moss
 Kris Mann - Bobby Talbot

Release
The film opened in the United States on February 5, 1988.

Critical reception 
On review aggregator Rotten Tomatoes, the film holds a 38% approval rating based on 8 reviews.

Variety praised the "convincing special effects and make-up and snappy direction" and said it "has enough thrills and spills in it to keep youth audiences alert".

Box office
The film flopped at the U.S. box office. It opened in seven theaters in the United States and grossed $15,842 in its opening weekend.

Awards
The film won a Goya Award for Best Special Effects by Gonzalo Gonzalo, Basilio Cortijo and Carlos de Marchis.

Home video 
Anchor Bay Entertainment released a DVD of the film in 2000. In 2011, Image Entertainment released a DVD of the film under the Midnight Madness Series. In 2016, British home video distributor, Arrow Films, released a special edition Blu-ray of the film, which contained a commentary track and interviews with several people associated with the film.

References

External links 
 

1988 films
1988 horror films
1980s monster movies
American monster movies
American natural horror films
American splatter films
Spanish splatter films
1980s English-language films
English-language Spanish films
Films based on British novels
Films set in the United States
Films shot in Madrid
Spanish horror films
1980s American films
1980s Spanish films